Amphichthys is a genus of toadfishes found in the western Atlantic Ocean.

Species
The recognized species in this genus are:
 Amphichthys cryptocentrus (Valenciennes, 1837) (Bocon toadfish)
 Amphichthys rubigenis Swainson, 1839

References

Batrachoididae